Ismail Qemali Gramshi was one of the delegates of the Albanian Declaration of Independence in 1912, representing Gramsh and Tomorrica regions.

References

People from Gramsh, Elbasan
All-Albanian Congress delegates
People from Manastir vilayet